Jaja may refer to:

People
 Jajá Coelho (born 1986), Jakson Avelino Coelho, Brazilian football striker
 Jajá (footballer, born 1986), Francisco Jaílson de Sousa, Brazilian football attacking midfielder
 Jajá (footballer, born 1995), Hugo Gomes dos Santos Silva, Brazilian football midfielder
 Jajá (footballer, born 2001), Jair Diego Alves de Brito, Brazilian football forward
 JAJA (drag queen), contestant from season one of Drag Race Thailand
 Jajá (footballer, born 2001), Brazilian footballer born Jair Diego Alves de Brito
 Jaja of Opobo (1821–1891), the first monarch of Opobo
 Jaja Wachuku (1918–1996), Nigerian politician and humanitarian
 Laurent Jalabert (born 1968), retired French professional cyclist nicknamed Jaja
 Samir Geagea (born 1952), also spelled Samir Ja'ja', a Lebanese politician and commander
 Seth Accra Jaja, Nigerian academic

Other uses
 Jaja (crater), a crater on Ceres named after the Abkhazian harvest goddess
 Jaja, Iran (disambiguation), various places in Iran
 Jajaja, Spanish onomatopoeia for laughter